A unitary state is a sovereign state governed as a single entity in which the central government is the supreme authority. The central government may create (or abolish) administrative divisions (sub-national units). Such units exercise only the powers that the central government chooses to delegate. Although political power may be delegated through devolution to regional or local governments by statute, the central government may abrogate the acts of devolved governments or curtail (or expand) their powers.

Unitary states stand in contrast to federations, also known as federal states. A large majority of the world's sovereign states (166 of the 193 UN member states) have a unitary system of government.

Devolution compared with federalism 
A unitary system of government can be considered to be the opposite of federalism. In federations, the provincial/regional governments share powers with the central government as equal actors through a written constitution, to which the consent of both is required to make amendments. This means that the sub-national units have a right to existence and powers that cannot be unilaterally changed by the central government.

There are, however, similarities between federalism and devolution. Devolution within a unitary state, like federalism, may be symmetrical, with all sub-national units having the same powers and status, or asymmetric, with sub-national units varying in their powers and status. Many unitary states have no areas possessing a degree of autonomy. In such countries, sub-national regions cannot decide their own laws. Examples are Romania, Ireland and Norway.

List of unitary states 
Italics: States with limited recognition from other sovereign states or intergovernmental organizations.

Unitary republics

 
 
 
 
 
 
 
 
 
 
 
 
 
 
 
 
 
 
 
 
 
 
 
 
 
 
 
 
 
 
 
 
 
 
 
 
 
 
 
 
 
 
 
 
 
 
 
 
 
 
 
 
 
 
 
 
 
 
 
 
 
 
 
 
 
 
  (limited recognition)

Unitary monarchies
The United Kingdom of Great Britain and Northern Ireland is an example of a unitary state. Scotland, Wales and Northern Ireland have a degree of autonomous devolved power, but such power is delegated by the Parliament of the United Kingdom, which may enact laws unilaterally altering or abolishing devolution.
Similarly in Spain, the devolved powers are delegated through the central government.

Unitary states with a unique form of government
  (emirate)

See also 
 Centralized government
 Constitutional economics
 Political economy
 Regional state
 Rule according to higher law
 Unicameralism
 Unitary authority

References

External links 
Unitary state at the Encyclopædia Britannica

Constitutional state types
Political geography